Rhode Island's apportionment was unchanged. Its elections were held on August 25, 1812.

See also 
 United States House of Representatives elections, 1812 and 1813
 List of United States representatives from Rhode Island

1812
Rhode Island
United States House of Representatives